Bradley Jacobs may refer to:
 Brad Jacobs (curler) (born 1985), Canadian curler and Olympic gold medallist
 Brad Jacobs, senior editor at Us Weekly Magazine